Jacobus Schoemaker Doyer, or Schoenmaker Doijer (24 June 1792, in Krefeld – 9 June 1867, in Zutphen) was a Dutch painter, primarily of genre and historical scenes.

Biography
He was the son of a pastor. His brother Hendrik (1791-1866) became a publisher in Zwolle, where their parents moved when they were still very young. There, he became close friends with the future Prime Minister Johan Rudolph Thorbecke, who stayed at their home in 1812 while his parents were away on family business.

In 1814, he moved to Amsterdam and became a student of Mattheus Ignatius van Bree. Later, he worked with Jurriaan Andriessen, a decorative painter. He continued his studies in Antwerp, then established himself in Amsterdam. In 1823, he spent some time in Kassel and Dresden, studying Italian statuary.

After 1829, he became a lecturer at the Koninklijke Academie voor Beeldende Kunsten, where his students included Christoffel Bisschop and Jacques Carabain.

In 1834, he created what are, perhaps, his most familiar works; a set of canvases honoring Jan van Speyk, a Dutch navy lieutenant who blew up his ship and himself, rather than surrender it to Belgian forces. Shortly after, on the recommendation of his friend, Thorbecke, he received a commission to produce a painting depicting the "Vrijwillige Jagers", a volunteer unit from Leiden University that distinguished itself during the Ten Days' Campaign against Belgian revolutionaries.

In 2000, a detail from one of his paintings of Van Speyk was used on the Dutch 80 euro cent postage stamp; part of a commemorative set celebrating the 200th anniversary of the Rijksmuseum.

Personal life
Jacobus Schoemaker Doyer was married to Petronella Evekink and had four sons and two daughters that reached adult age. The couple's sons include colonial administrator and mayor Hendrik Doijer and professor .

References

External links

1792 births
1867 deaths
19th-century Dutch painters
Dutch male painters
Dutch genre painters
History painters
People from Krefeld
19th-century Dutch male artists